Sergei Aleksandrovich Tumasyan (born 31 January 1990) is a Russian former professional football player of Armenian descent for Dragon Pathumwan Kanchanaburi in the Thai League 3.

Career
Tumasyan made his professional debut for FC Rostov on 13 July 2010 in the Russian Cup game against FC Salyut Belgorod.

Tumasyan joined PFK Metallurg Bekabad in Uzbekistan for the 2019 season.

Personal life
He is the older brother of Aleksandr Tumasyan, younger brother of Denis Tumasyan and a son of Aleksandr Tumasyan.

Honours

Club
Dragon Pathumwan Kanchanaburi 
Thai League 3 Western Region (1): 2022–23

References

External links
 
 Profile at championat.ru

1990 births
Sportspeople from Rostov-on-Don
Living people
Russian footballers
FC SKA Rostov-on-Don players
Russian expatriate footballers
Expatriate footballers in Finland
Russian people of Armenian descent
FC Rostov players
Russian Premier League players
Uzbekistan Super League players
Expatriate footballers in Estonia
Esiliiga players
Meistriliiga players
FCI Tallinn players
Nõmme Kalju FC players
FC Sibir Novosibirsk players
PFK Metallurg Bekabad players
Association football midfielders
Expatriate footballers in Thailand
Expatriate footballers in Armenia
Expatriate footballers in Uzbekistan
Russian expatriate sportspeople in Armenia
Russian expatriate sportspeople in Estonia
Russian expatriate sportspeople in Finland
Russian expatriate sportspeople in Thailand
Russian expatriate sportspeople in Uzbekistan